Geologiska föreningen is a scientific learned society founded in Sweden in 1871. The society was formerly known as Geologiska föreningen i Stockholm.

Publications

The society publishes GFF (formerly Geologiska Föreningens Förhandlingar), a peer-reviewed academic journal which focused on the geology, paleontology, and petrology of Baltoscandia and Northern Europe in general. It also published the quarterly magazine Geologisk Forum.

External links
 

Learned societies of Sweden
Organizations established in 1871
Geology societies